1443 Ruppina, provisional designation , is an asteroid from the outer region of the asteroid belt, approximately 17 kilometers in diameter. It was discovered on 29 December 1937, by German astronomer Karl Reinmuth at Heidelberg Observatory in southwest Germany. It is named for the German city Ruppin.

Orbit and classification 

Ruppina asteroid orbits the Sun in the outer main-belt at a distance of 2.7–3.1 AU once every 5.04 years (1,840 days). Its orbit has an eccentricity of 0.06 and an inclination of 2° with respect to the ecliptic.

Physical characteristics

Rotation period 

In November 2007, the first rotational lightcurve of Ruppina was obtained at Whitin Observatory in Massachusetts, United States. Lightcurve analysis gave a well-defined rotation period of 5.880 hours with a brightness variation of 0.35 magnitude. During the 2014-apparition of Ruppina, an identical period was obtained again at Whitin Observatory, while photometric observations in the R-band at the Palomar Transient Factory in California, gave a period of 5.890 and 5.9046 hours with an amplitude of 0.27 and 0.28, respectively.

Diameter and albedo 

According to the surveys carried out by the Japanese Akari satellite and NASA's Wide-field Infrared Survey Explorer with its subsequent NEOWISE mission, Ruppina measures approximately 16.5 kilometers in diameter and its surface has an albedo of 0.176 and 0.21, respectively. Observations at the Whitin Observatory gave an albedo of 0.20 and a diameter of 18 kilometers, while the Collaborative Asteroid Lightcurve Link assumes a standard albedo for carbonaceous C-type asteroids of 0.057, and consequently derives a much larger diameter of 32.18 kilometers with an absolute magnitude of 11.19.

Naming 

This minor planet is named for the German city of Ruppin, birthplace of astronomer Martin Ebell, who proposed the name and after whom the minor planet 1205 Ebella is named. The official naming citation was published in The Names of the Minor Planets by Paul Herget in 1955.

References

External links 
 Asteroid Lightcurve Database (LCDB), query form (info )
 Dictionary of Minor Planet Names, Google books
 Asteroids and comets rotation curves, CdR – Observatoire de Genève, Raoul Behrend
 Discovery Circumstances: Numbered Minor Planets (1)-(5000) – Minor Planet Center
 
 

 

001443
Discoveries by Karl Wilhelm Reinmuth
Named minor planets
19371229